Achery is a commune in the department of Aisne in the Hauts-de-France region of northern France.

Geography
Achery is located some 20 km south by southeast of Saint-Quentin and 10 km north-east of Tergnier. The commune is on the Oise river which flows south forming the north-western border of the commune before flowing through the commune and continuing south. The tributary of the Oise, the Serre, forms the southern border of the commune before joining the Oise just south of Achery.  The town of Achery is about 1.5 km directly south of Mayot on Highway D13 which passes through Achery south to  Danizy.  Other roads into the commune are the D643 (Rue Jules Lesage) west from the village to Travecy and also east (Rue Jean Moulin) to Anguilcourt-le-Sart.  The Rue de Fort forms most of the northern border of the commune with various country roads forming most of the western border.

Neighbouring communes and villages

Some distance from the town there is a quarry and an old gunpowder factory.

History
In the distant past, the village was called Achiriacus in 990.

Achery had its own lords. The lordship had his castle but it was destroyed once before being rebuilt in the 14th century. The lordship fell to the Count of Anizy. During the French Revolution the castle was destroyed and Achery became an independent commune. During the First World War, the village was completely destroyed but was rebuilt after the war.

Administration

List of Mayors of Achery

Population

Events
 Flea market in May
 Festival on the third Sunday in June

Sites and monuments

 The Church of Saint-Martin: rebuilt after the First World War
 An Old water mill
 The Dovecote Square
 Marshes and ponds
 Remains of many blockhouses of the Hindenburg Line

See also
 Communes of the Aisne department

References

External links
 Achery on Géoportail, National Geographic Institute (IGN) website 
 Achery on the 1750 Cassini Map

Communes of Aisne